Kim Hun (born April 4, 1992) is a South Korean taekwondo fighter. He won a silver medal at the 2013 World Taekwondo Championships, a gold medal at the 2015 Moscow Grand prix, and a bronze medal at the 2015 Manchester Grand prix.

References

1992 births
Living people
South Korean male taekwondo practitioners
Universiade gold medalists for South Korea
Universiade medalists in taekwondo
Medalists at the 2011 Summer Universiade
21st-century South Korean people